Taphrina aurea is an ascomycete fungus that is a plant pathogen. It causes leaf blisters on poplar trees.

References

External links

Fungal tree pathogens and diseases
Taphrinomycetes